Robin Wright-Jones (born January 31, 1950) was a Democratic member of the Missouri Senate, representing the 5th district from 2007 to 2013. Jamilah Nasheed succeeded her in this office. Her district covers part of City of St. Louis. She previously served as a member of the Missouri House of Representatives from 2002 through 2007, after winning a special election on March 26, 2002.

Robin Wright-Jones was fined $271,580 in 2013 for violations of Missouri law that bars candidates from converting campaign funds to personal use. The fine was for failure to accurately report contributions, failure to report expenditures, improperly reporting consulting fees and cash expenditures. This fine was later reduced to $229,964.

Wright-Jones appealed and in February 2018 the Missouri Supreme Court upheld the state ethics commission's judgment against her.

References

External links
Missouri Senate - Robin Wright-Jones official government website
 
Follow the Money - Robin Wright-Jones
2008 2006  2004 2002 campaign contributions

1950 births
Living people
Politicians from St. Louis
Women state legislators in Missouri
African-American state legislators in Missouri
Democratic Party Missouri state senators
Democratic Party members of the Missouri House of Representatives
University of Missouri–St. Louis alumni
21st-century African-American people
21st-century African-American women
20th-century African-American people
20th-century African-American women